Dorofeyevsky is a rural locality (a khutor) in Generalovskoye Rural Settlement, Kotelnikovsky District, Volgograd Oblast, Russia. The population was 293 as of 2010. There are 12 streets.

Geography 
Dorofeyevsky is located on the left bank of the Aksay Yesaulovsky, 54 km north of Kotelnikovo (the district's administrative centre) by road. Novoaksaysky is the nearest rural locality.

References 

Rural localities in Kotelnikovsky District